Kari Peter Conrad von Bagh (29 August 1943 – 17 September 2014) was a Finnish film historian and director. Von Bagh worked as the head of the Finnish Film Archive. He was the editor-in-chief of Filmihullu magazine and co-founder and director of the Midnight Sun Film Festival. Since 2001, he had been the artistic director of the film festival Il Cinema Ritrovato in Bologna. Von Bagh was a member of the jury in the competition category of 2004 Cannes Film Festival.

Films directed by Peter von Bagh are screened at prestigious international forums, including an extensive retrospective of his works at the Rotterdam International Film Festival and Festival Internacional de Cine Independente in Buenos Aires in 2012, and at the Tromsø International Film Festival in 2013.

Principal works of Peter von Bagh's production of approximately 40 non-fiction books, mostly on cinema, and some 60 films for both the cinemas and television include his internationally successful films Helsinki, Forever (2008) and Sodankylä, Forever (2010–2011, a documentary series of the first twenty-five years of the Midnight Sun Film Festival), Song of Finland ("The Story of Art in Finland During the Era of Independence", a twelve-episode television series, YLE 2003–04, and a book published by WSOY 2007), Elokuvan historia ("History of Cinema", a 52-episode radio series, YLE and a book published by W&G 1975, Otava 1998, 2004) and Tähtien kirja ("The Book of Stars", Otava, 2006). The book Aki Kaurismäki has been translated into several languages. He died in 2014 at the age of 71.

Studies 
Born to a German Russian psychiatrist father, Von Bagh graduated from the Oulun lyseo Upper Secondary School in 1961. He took his Master of Arts degree at University of Helsinki in 1970 with a combination of subjects consisting of Theoretical Philosophy, Sociology, Aesthetics, and Literature. His dissertation Elokuvalliset keinot ja niiden käyttö: Alfred Hitchcockin Vertigo was later published as a book (Helsingin yliopisto, 1979). Von Bagh took his degree of Doctor of Social Sciences in 2002. His doctoral thesis Peili jolla oli muisti – elokuvallinen kollaasi kadonneen ajan merkityksien hahmottajana (1895–1970), (SKS 2002) examines the fundamental units of cinematic expression, montage and collage.

Von Bagh has taught and lectured at several schools and universities, e.g. as Professor of Film History at Aalto University since 2001. He has also compiled a textbook on cinema, Salainen muisti (Sanoma Pro, 2009), to be used in schools.

The connecting thought in Peter von Bagh's production is the history of everyday Finnish life: images of details conveying something of what the life of the Finns has been like. The films Vuosi 1952 ("The Year 1952", 1980), Viimeinen kesä 1944 ("The Last Summer 1944", 1992), Helsinki, Forever (2008) and Splinters – A Century of an Artistic Family (2011) provide a magnifying glass for peeking at history, defined by a certain moment in time, location, or an artistic family.

In a Letter to the Director published in the Pordenone Silent Film Festival catalogue 2008, Chris Marker wrote about von Bagh's film Helsinki, Forever: "'Few movies may boast a stronger opening sequence, and few movies offer such an extraordinary finale. And in-between I guess what I admire most is the fluidity of the editing, your way to play with time in a manner that comes at once as always surprising and perfectly natural. HELSINKI deserves its rank among the great "city-poems", and I'd rate it above Ruttmann, for instance, for one reason: if I read in his BERLIN the social commitment and the aesthetic maestria, I don't feel the personal acquaintance with the city, its history, its ghosts, that I found in yours. Also something that many have a tendency to underestimate but which for me is crucial: the music. The Zeppelin sequence by itself carries a haunting beauty, akin to Fellini's liner, but I don't think it would attain this climax of emotion if at that moment the music didn't bring the perfect tune of melancholia. So with the choice of incredible documents and the unfailing mixture of both musical items, editing and score, you made an unforgettable film."

Von Bagh made dozens of films for television, including portraits of prominent Finns from different fields (Tapio Rautavaara in Tapsa – Slashes from a Rover's Life, 1980; Paavo Nurmi, 1978; Otto Ville Kuusinen in Mies varjossa, 1994), musicians (Olavi Virta, 1972; Suomi Pop, 1984), actors (Tauno Palo, 1981) and film directors (Edvin Laine, 2006; Mikko Niskanen, 2010).

Von Bagh's fiction films are often documentary in their own way: the main character of The Count (1971) is Pertti Ylermi Lindgren, a con man elevated to nobility by the tabloid papers. Pockpicket (1968) is a variation on Robert Bresson's Pickpocket (1959). In it, an estranged young man attempts to instil tension into his life by slipping banknotes into the wallets of the city-dwellers.

As a scriptwriter, Von Bagh has participated in the making of Risto Jarva's Time of Roses (1969), Rally (1970) and When the Heavens Fall.. (1972).

Literary production 
Von Bagh's literary production includes almost 40 books of non-fiction. In 2007, von Bagh received the Ministry of Education and Culture, Finland's State Award for Public Information for a Lifetime Achievement. The same year his book Song of Finland was awarded The Finlandia Literary Prize for Non-Fiction. He has received the State Award for Public Information twice, in 1986 for Iskelmän kultainen kirja ("Golden Book of Finnish Pop Songs" co-author Ilpo Hakasalo) and in 1975 for Elokuvan historia ("History of Cinema". In 1992 The Finnish Literature Society SKS presented him with the SKS Elias Lönnroth Award for Suomalaisen elokuvan kultainen kirja (Golden Book of Finnish Cinema").

Von Bagh's essays and articles have been published in several film books and magazines both in Finland and abroad. The most famous of these are the French L'Écran, Cahiers du cinéma, Trafic and Cinema 02, the Italian Cinegrafie, the Spanish Nosferatu, the Swedish Chaplin, the British Movie, etc.

Up until his death Peter von Bagh worked as the editor-in-chief of Filmihullu, the magazine he founded in 1968.

Abroad, von Bagh worked as a cinema expert for the French non-fiction publishing house Larousse in 2009, and as a permanent contributing editor of the Italian Einaudi publishing company.

Love kirjat 
Peter von Bagh was also active promoter of literature in his native country, working as an editor and preface writer for the Love kirjat publishing company during 1977–1996. The titles published by Love kirjat, more than one hundred, include translations of world literature classics from Aiskhylos (Oresteia, Love 1991) to Balzac (Lost Illusions, Love 1983, The Splendors and Miseries of Courtesans''', Love 1991), from Jack London (The Iron Heel, Love 1977) to August Strindberg (Pieni katekismus, Love 1981), to poetry (e.g. Matti Rossi), essayism (e.g. Raoul Palmgren) and detective stories (James Cain: Double Indemnity, Love 1982), literature research (György Lukács Balzac ja ranskalainen realismi, Love 1978), not forgetting economics, military history, and Sigmund Freud The Joke and Its Relation to the Unconscious, Love 1983).

Love kirjat has also brought several fundamental works of film literature to the Finnish readers, e.g. André Bazin's essays (Love 1981, 1990), Sergei Eisenstein's Film Form: Essays in Film Theory (Love, 1978); Federico Fellini's Fellini on Fellini (Love, 1980) and Giulietta (Love, 1990); Jean Renoir's My Life and My Films (Love, 1980), for which Peter von Bagh has written a preface. Other important Love translations are Elokuva Godardin mukaan, a collection of film criticism by Jean-Luc Godard, translated into Finnish by Sakari Toiviainen (Love, 1984), and François Truffaut's The Films in My Life (Love, 1982).

Besides film literature, Love also published elemental work of other art forms, e.g. Meyerhold's A Revolution in Theatre (Love, 1981) and Hanns Eisler's essays on music (Love, 1980).

 Festival directorships 
The Midnight Sun Film Festival was founded in 1986 on the initiative of Anssi Mänttäri. In addition to Mänttäri, the Festival policy and guidelines were created by Kaurismäki brothers, Mika and Aki Kaurismäki and Peter von Bagh.

The key elements of this festival of the midnight sun are the magical light of the North, and the film screenings. Contrary to the glittering award forums, the Midnight Sun Film Festival does not look for glamour. Instead, the main role is given to the films. The programming includes both classics and forward-looking works from the world over. They are presented in their original format, the silent films accompanied by live music.

The two-hour morning discussions, hosted by Peter von Bagh throughout the Festival's history, are internationally unique items. From discussions with hundreds of guests, Peter von Bagh has selected the best elements for his book Sodankylä, Forever (WSOY, 2010) and a four-part documentary series of the same name. The series has garnered extensive praise at the world's film forums, e.g. at Lincoln Center in New York in August 2011 when Nico Baumbach wrote in Film Comment (Sept/Oct 2011):

""Von Bagh's four-part series is a wise and generous act of preservation. Assembled largely from interviews with directors conducted over a 25-year period at the Midnight Sun Film Festival he runs in the tiny Finnish municipality of Sodankylä, the film does a double duty as a celebration of the festival itself and as a veritable history of cinema and the 20th century. As von Bagh explains, the life of cinema is short enough "that a small festival far up north can span it completely." One of the questions addressed to all guests – "What was the first film you saw?" – becomes a way to extend the story of the festival back to the silent era, because a "festival is as deep as the memory it contains.""

The Midnight Sun Film Festival guest list included e.g. the French Chris Marker, Jean Rouch, Jean-Pierre Gorin, Jean-Pierre Léaud, Claude Chabrol, Jacques Demy, Agnès Varda, Robert Guédiguian and the brothers Pierre and Luc Dardenne, the Iranian Jafar Panahi, Abbas Kiarostami and Samira Makhmalbaf, the Hungarian István Szabó, Miklós Jancsó and Béla Tarr, the Polish Krzysztof Kieslowski, Agnieszka Holland, Jerzy Kawalerowicz and Krzysztof Zanussi, the Czech Ivan Passer and Miloš Forman, the Russian Marlen Khutsiev, Andrei Konchalovsky, Alexei German, Andrei Smirnov. Samuel Fuller, D. A. Pennebaker, Jim Jarmusch, Roger Corman, Vincent Sherman, Joseph H. Lewis and Francis Ford Coppola from the USA, the Argentinian Fernando Solanas, the Palestinian Elia Suleiman, the Israeli Amos Gitai, the German Wim Wenders and Robby Müller, the Egyptian Youssef Chahine, the Malinese Souleymane Cissé, the Italians Nanni Moretti, Paolo Taviani, Sergio Sollima and Dino Risi. Dusan Makavejev and Emir Kusturica from former Yugoslavia, and during the first year, Michael Powell from the United Kingdom.

In addition, the festival has had the privilege of being able to listen to major film writers like Joāo Bénard da Costa, Jim Hoberman, Jean Douchet, Bernard Eisenschitz and Olaf Möller.

From 2001 Peter von Bagh worked as the Artistic Director of Il Cinema Ritrovato Festival in Bologna. The Festival specializes in "recovered" treasures, previously believed lost or unknown, silent films and restored prints. The screen annually erected in Piazza Maggiore in Bologna at the turn of June/July attracts an audience of thousands of spectators. The Festival audience includes both local cinephiles and international specialists of the field.

Von Bagh also acted as an Artistic Expert for San Sebastián International Film Festival in 2009, the Visiting Artistic Director of the Telluride Film Festival in 1997, and as a member of the Cannes Film Festival Competition section in 2004.

 Film archives 
Peter von Bagh worked as the executive director of the Finnish Film Archive in 1966–1969, and as the Programme Planner until 1984. During that period, the Archive's programming gained its present esteemed reputation, and the number of screenings proliferated.

In the speech von Bagh gave at the FIAF (International Federation of Film Archives) conference in Lisbon in 1989 he emphasized: 
"When I started the Archive offered only two screenings per week. I immediately increased the number of screenings to four. Soon we managed to screen eight films each week. A few years passed this way, and when the confidence of the audience had solidified, we began to screen three films a day." It was a golden era for the cinemas in Helsinki. An example: "In the 1970s Bresson's films brought in more money in Helsinki than in Paris."

Peter von Bagh continues: "Many archives have fallen for easy baits and an emphasis on fashionable films. That is the best way to lose an audience whose confidence can only be won through a patient building process. Officials equipped with short-sighted calculations may find it difficult to understand why a small archive would order a rare film from a distant country for one screening only. Calculations like this easily paralyzes socio-cultural activities altogether. The discrepancy hangs in the air, written in fiery letters: the audience seems to be drooling after de Palma and Eastwood, although an inner voice calls you to screen bodies of works scrutinizing the output of Victor Sjöström and Carl Th. Dreyer...
The first screening of Victor Sjöström or Carl Th. Dreyer might bring in fifteen people, but after five years and some more efforts there will be a full house. The preservation prints of an early Yevgeni Bauer film, or Maurice Tourneur's The Wishing Ring (which would be almost nothing in 16 mm or in video) will look just miraculous to any public that comes in – and there will be one once you build a place where everyone can trust that miracles take place, almost on daily basis. --. In the beginning a film maybe a complete unknown but the visiting card it leaves behind remains forever: a wonderful beauty."

In the same speech, von Bagh defines the responsibilities of the archives: preservation of a confidential relationship with the audience, protection and restoration of the classics, and especially domestic films, and supportto film clubs as a common film bank which makes the screenings possible.

 Works 

 Films 

 Early short films 
 Pockpicket –  Recollections of a Helsinki Bourgeois Youth (with Pentti Maisala, 1968) 
 Vanhan valtaus (Bagh–Toiviainen–Maisala–Katainen, 1968) 
 December (1969)

 Feature films 
 The Count ("Kreivi") (1971)

 Feature-length documentaries for theatrical distribution 
 Viimeinen kesä 1944 (1992) 
 Vuosi 1939 (1993)

 TV productions 
 Olavi Virta (1972) 
 Paavo Nurmi – The Man and His Times (with Markku Koski, 1978) 
 Sinitaivas – matka muistojen maisemaan (1978) 
  Fragments of the life of Reino Helismaa (1979)
 Tankavaaran Travolta (1979) 
 Vuosi 1952 (1980) 
 Tapsa – Slashes from a Rover's Life (1980) 
 Laulajan lähtö (1980) 
 Tauno Palo (1981) 
 Väliasemalla Veikko Lavi (1982) 
 A Day at the Grave of Karl Marx (1983)
 Suomi Pop 1–5 – suomalaisen iskelmän historia (1984–1985)
 Lähikuvassa 1–19: Tuomari Nurmio, Remu Aaltonen, Pelle Miljoona, Juice Leskinen, Hassisen Kone, Eppu Normaali, Dave "Isokynä" Lindholm, Rauli "Badding" Somerjoki, Kipparikvartetti, Erkki Junkkarinen, Jorma Ikävalko, Matti Jurva, Harmony Sisters, Esa Pakarinen, Palle, Henry Theel, Vili Vesterinen, Eugen Malmstén ja Big Band, Metro-Tytöt (1983–1992)
 Yhdeksän hetkeä Urho Kekkosen elämästä (1985) 
 Elämä ja aurinko – rapsodia F.E. Sillanpään maisemasta (1985)
 Isoveli (1985) 
 Ajan draama (1986) 
 Muisto (1987) 
 Faaraoiden maa (1987) 
 Asema (1987)
 Tämä on Suomi (1987) 
 Olavi Virta (1987) 
 Jukeboxin ikivihreät (1988) 
 Henkilökohtainen ongelma (1988) 
 SF:n tarina 1–6 (1990–1991)
 T.J. Särkkä 100 vuotta (1990) 
 Kohtaaminen (1992) 
 Suomi-Filmin tarina 1–5 (1993) 
 Fennadan tarina 1–3 (1993) 
 Mies varjossa 1–3 (& Elina Katainen & Iikka Vehkalahti, 1994)
 Erään oopperan synty: Lapualaisooppera (1996) 
 Oi kallis Suomenmaa 1–8 (1997) (16-osainen versio: 1999) 
  <<Víctor Erice & El sol del membrillo<< Victor Eríce: unelma valosta (1997) 
 Irma Seikkula – kulta-ajan tähti (1998) 
 Sininen laulu – Suomen taiteiden tarina 1–12 (2003–2004) 
 Kansalainen Puupää (Armand Lohikosken muotokuva) (2004)
 Edvin Laine (2006)
  Helsinki, Forever (2008) 
 Tähtien tarina 1–6: Hannes Häyrinen, Ville Salminen, Hannu Leminen, Eeva-Kaarina Volanen, Leif Wager, Tarmo Manni (2008)
 Ohjaaja matkalla ihmiseksi: Mikko Niskasen tarina 1–3 (2010) 
  Sodankylä, Forever 1–4: Elokuvan vuosisata, Ensimmäisen elokuvamuiston kaiho, Ikuinen aika, Valon draama (2010–2011)
  Splinters – A Century of an Artistic Family (2011) 
  The Finns and Money: A Love Story (2011)

 Scriptwriter for films by other directors 
 Time of Roses (Jarva, 1969)
 Summer Rebellion (team Sex, 1970)
 Rally (Jarva, 1970)
  When the Heavens Fall... (Jarva, 1972)
 Synopsis for Aki Kaurismäki's I Hired a Contract Killer (1990)

 Articles in film books 
 The Lumière Project: The European Film Archives at the Crossroads (Cathrine A. SUROWIEC), Associação Projeto Lumiere, Lissabon 1996,  
 Cinémas d'Europe du Nord. De Fritz Lang á Lars von Trier (Claire VALADE), Arte Editions, Mille et une nuits, Paris 1998,  
 Nordic Explorations. Film Before 1930 (John FULLERTON & Jan OLSSON), John Libbey et co, Stockholm 1999,  
 Stars au feminin, (Gian Luca FARINELLE & Jean-Loup PASSEK), Centre Pompidou, Paris 2000, 
 Raoul Walsh (Michael Henry WILSON), Cinémathèque Française, Paris 2001,  
 Edgar G. Ulmer Le bandit démasqué (Charles TATUM), Éditions Yellow Now, Paris 2002, 
 Don Siegel und seine Filme (Frank ARNOLD), Vertigo, München 2003,  
 The Unknown Orson Welles (Stefan DRÖSSLER), Belleville Filmmuseum München, München 2004,  
 Ai poeti non si spara. Vittorio Cottafavi tra cinema e televisione, (Adriano APRA & Giulio BURSI), Cineteca di Bologna, Bologne 2010,  
 Luci del ribalta (avec Anna Fiaccarini et Cecilia Cenciarelli), Cineteca Bologna, 2002, 

 Books in Finnish 
 Uuteen elokuvaan. Kirjoituksia elokuvasta, Von Bagh, Peter, WSOY, Helsinki 1967 
 Elävältä haudatut kuvat, Tammi, Helsinki 1969
 Paljastava silmä. Luokat taistelevat – elokuvat kertovat, Weilin+Göös, Helsinki 1973, 
 Elokuvan historia, Weilin+Göös, Helsinki 1975,  (nouvelle édition 1998 et 2004)
 Olavi Virta (with Pekka Aarnio & Markku Koski), WSOY, Helsinki [1977], 
 Teatterikirja (with Pekka Milonoff), Love, Helsinki 1977, 
 Elvis! Amerikkalaisen laulajan elämä ja kuolema, Love, Helsinki 1977, 
 Hitchcock. Merkintöjä Alfred Hitchcockin elokuvasta Vertigo, Suomen Elokuvasäätiö, Helsinki 1979, 
 Joris Ivens – dokumentaristin muotokuva, Suomen Elokuva-arkisto, Helsinki 1981 
 Englantilainen elokuva, Suomen Elokuva-arkisto, Helsinki 1980, 
 Taikayö, Love, Helsinki 1981, 
 Jean Cocteau (edited by Claude Beylie), Suomen elokuva-arkisto, Helsinki 1983, 
 Kymmenen elokuvaa, Love, Helsinki 1984, 
 Iskelmän kultainen kirja (with Ilpo Hakasalo), Otava, Helsinki 1986, 
 Elämää suuremmat elokuvat, Otava, Helsinki 1989, 
 Elokuvan ilokirja, Otava, Helsinki 1990, 
 Kaipuun punainen hetki, Otava, Helsinki 1991, 
 Suomalaisen elokuvan kultainen kirja, Suomen Elokuva-arkisto, Helsinki 1992, 
 Elämää suuremmat elokuvat II, Otava, Helsinki 1996, 
 Paras elokuvakirja (edited by Von Bagh), WSOY, Helsinki 1995, 
 Rikoksen hehku, Otava, Helsinki 1997, 
 Suomalaisen elokuvan pieni historia, Otava, Helsinki 2000, 
 Lööppikirja (with Koski, Markku), Like, Helsinki 2000, 
 Hevoset ja minä (with Timo Aarniala), Like, Helsinki 2000, 
 Peili jolla ei ollut muisti, SKS, Helsinki 2002, 
 Suomalaisen elokuvan uusi kultainen kirja, Otava, Helsinki 2005, 
 Aki Kaurismäki, WSOY, Helsinki 2006,  (Kaurismäki über Kaurismäki, Alexander Verlag Berlin)
 Tähtien kirja, Otava, Helsinki 2006, 
 Sininen laulu. Itsenäisen Suomen taiteiden tarina, WSOY, Helsinki 2007, 
 Vuosisadan tarina. Dokumenttielokuvan historia, Teos, Helsinki 2007, 
 Salainen muisti, WSOY, Helsinki 2009, 
 Lajien synty. Elokuvan rakastetuimmat lajit, WSOY, Helsinki 2009, 
 Sodankylä ikuisesti, WSOY, Helsinki 2010, 
 Junassa, WSOY, Helsinki 2011,   
 Cinefilia, WSOY, Helsinki 2013, 
 Chaplin, LIKE, Helsinki 2013, 

 Radio works 
Hundreds of radio programmes from 1961, including extensive series:
 Yöradio Suuria elokuvaohjaajia (1963)
 Amerikan ääniä (1974)
 Kohtaamisia (1976)
 Keskusteluja elokuvasta (1981)
 Elämää suuremmat elokuvat (1984–1993 10 programmes each year, altogether 100)
 Elämää suuremmat näyttelijät (1997, 36 programmes)
 Elokuvan historia (2006, 52 programmes)

Awards and recognitions
 2013 Kultainen Venla Award for a Lifetime Achievement in TV work
 2007 State Award for Public Information for a Lifetime Achievement  
 2007 The Finlandia Literary Prize for Non-Fiction for the book Sininen laulu (The Song of Finland)
 2005 The DocPoint Documentary Festival Aho & Soldan Lifetime Achievement Award 
 2005 The Koura Award for the best TV programme of the year for 
Sininen laulu (The Song of Finland)
 1992 The Finnish Literature Society SKS Ellias Lönnroth Award for Suomalaisen elokuvan kultainen kirja 
 1992 The Concrete Jussi (Betoni-Jussi) Lifetime Award
 1991 Venla Award for the TV series SF:n tarina I-VI 
 1986 State Award for Public Information for the book Iskelmän kultainen kirja (with co-author Ilpo Hakasalo)
 1984 Venla Award for Suomi Pop – suomalaisen iskelmän historia 1980 State Film Award for Vuosi 1952 
 1978 Annual Theatre Award of the Theatre Centre (Vuoden teatteriteko) for the book Teatterikirja (co-editor Pekka Milonoff) 
 1975 State Award for Public Information for the book Elokuvan historia (History of Cinema)

Grants 
 Arts Promotion Centre Finland Artist Grant for fifteen years 1984–1999
 The Finnish Cultural Foundation (Suomen Kulttuurirahasto) Grant for Eminent Work 2011

Education degrees 
 Undergraduate: Oulun Lyseo Upper Secondary School, 1961
 Bachelor of Arts: University of Helsinki, 1970 
 Doctor of Social Sciences: University of Helsinki, 2002

References 

 Biography at the Cannes Film Festival site

External links 

 

Finnish film directors
1943 births
2014 deaths
Film people from Helsinki
Tieto-Finlandia Award winners
20th-century Finnish people
Finnish-language writers
Finnish screenwriters
Film historians
Finnish television directors
Finnish television writers
Academic staff of Aalto University
Finnish people of German-Russian descent